Numerous plants have been introduced to the US state of New Jersey in the last four hundred years, and many of them have become invasive species that compete with the native plants and suppress their growth. Duke Farms identified 55 invasive species on its property and investigates methods to control them. Major invaders are:

See also
Invasive species in the United States

References

External links
An Overview of Nonindigenous Plant Species in New Jersey. State of New Jersey.
invasivespecies.gov United States Government.

Natural history of New Jersey
Biota of New Jersey
Flora of New Jersey
New Jersey
Invasive plants